The Rolls-Royce RB.401 was a British two-spool business jet engine which Rolls-Royce started to develop in the mid-1970s as a replacement for the Viper. RB.401-06 prototype engines were already being manufactured when a decision to develop the higher thrust RB.401-07 was taken. 

Although ground testing of both the -06 and -07 continued into the early 1980s, a lack of funds caused the project to be cancelled.

Design and development
Although the basic configuration of both engines was almost identical, the -07 variant had a larger fan diameter. The -06 version HP compressor was based on the eight-stage version of the RC34B research compressor, unscaled, whereas the -07 was a scaled-up unit. A single stage fan, driven by a two-stage LP turbine, supercharged the HP compressor which was driven by the single stage transonic HP turbine. The combustor was annular and the co-annular exhaust featured a lightweight target type thrust reverser.

Specifications (RB.401-07)

See also

References

Notes

Bibliography

 Gunston, Bill. World Encyclopedia of Aero Engines. Cambridge, England. Patrick Stephens Limited, 1989. 
 Taylor, John W.R. Jane's All the World's Aircraft 1984-85., London, Jane's Publishing Company Ltd, 1984. . 

RB401
High-bypass turbofan engines
1970s turbofan engines